Jerry J. Klein (born November 21, 1951) is an American politician. He is a member of the North Dakota State Senate from the 14th District, serving since 1997. He is a member of the Republican party.

References

Living people
1951 births
Presidents pro tempore of the North Dakota Senate
Republican Party North Dakota state senators
21st-century American politicians
Politicians from Aberdeen, South Dakota